Too Close to Home is an American television drama series, created, executive produced, written and directed by Tyler Perry that debuted on TLC on August 22, 2016. It is the first scripted series for TLC. TLC renewed the show for a second season on September 1, 2016, which premiered on January 4, 2017. Reruns of the show often aired on OWN where all of Tyler Perry's other shows regularly air.

It was officially ordered as a series on March 31, 2016 with an eight-episode order. Danielle Savre was cast as the series' lead, and Heather Locklear and Matt Battaglia make guest appearances.

On November 2, 2017, it was confirmed that the show had been cancelled and would not be renewed for a third season.

Plot
The series follows a young woman, Anna, from a working class life who, after having an affair with the President of the United States, becomes the center of a political scandal. When the scandal erupts, she returns to her old life. As soon as she arrives, she is met with several unresolved issues from family members and past lovers.

Cast and characters

Main
 Danielle Savre as Annie Belle "Anna" Hayes, a woman who works in the White House, but after her affair with the President is revealed she resorts to a safe place, which is her hometown in Happy, Alabama
 Brock O'Hurn as Brody Allen, Anna's former love interest who currently has feelings for Bonnie
 Kelly Sullivan as Bonnie Hayes, Anna's eldest sister, who has natural love for Anna. She takes care of Anna's daughter Rebel, Shelby's son Mac, and her mother Jolene. She also helps Brody take care of his father, Dr Allen. She also works at the May Sally's Diner
 Brad Benedict as J.B., Brody's estranged half-brother and Bonnie's ex-boyfriend
 Brooke Anne Smith as Michelle "Shelby" Hayes, the youngest Hayes sister and Mac's mother, who is a drug and alcohol addict
 Alpha Trivette as Doctor Allen, Brody's father who has dementia 
 Trisha Rae Stahl as Jolene, Anna, Bonnie and Shelby's mother who is suffering from morbid obesity and hoarding
 Robert Craighead as Sheriff Mobley
 Annie Thrash as Rebel, Anna's 15-year-old daughter
 Curran Walters as Mac, Shelby's teenage son
 Crystle Stewart as Frankie (season 2), a licensed therapist and the Hayes' neighbor who knows about Regina and Elm's affair
 Justin Gabriel as Rick (season 2; recurring, season 1), Shelby's love interest
 Nick Ballard as Dax (season 2; recurring, season 1), Anna's friend who works with her in the White House
 Charles Justo as Victor (season 2; recurring, season 1), Anna's friend and Dax's boyfriend

Recurring
 Christian Ochoa as John (season 1), a news reporter
 Ashley Love-Mills as Valerie, Anna's former best friend who works with her in the White House
 Jason Vendryes as Agent Larry (season 1)
 Matt Battaglia as President Thomas Christian (season 2; guest, season 1), Anna's love interest
 Heather Locklear as First Lady Katelynn Christian (season 2; guest, season 1)
 Angela Rigsby as Octavia (season 2; guest, season 1), Bonnie's neighbor and coworker
 Azur-De Johnson as Regina (season 2), Nelson's wife who has an affair with his best friend, Elm
 Courtney Burrell as Nelson (season 2), Octavia's older brother and Regina's husband who returns after serving time in the army
 Nelson Estevez as Elm (season 2), Nelson's friend and Tina's husband
 K. D. Aubert as Tina (season 2), Elm's wife
 James Shanklin as Eli (season 2), Rebel and Mack's father

Episodes

Series overview

Season 1 (2016)

Season 2 (2017)

References

External links
 

TLC (TV network) original programming
2016 American television series debuts
2017 American television series endings
2010s American drama television series
English-language television shows
Television series created by Tyler Perry
Television shows filmed in Georgia (U.S. state)
White House in fiction
Television series by Tyler Perry Studios